Me and Maxx is an American television sitcom that aired on NBC from March 22 to July 25, 1980. The plot involved a young girl, Maxx (Melissa Michaelsen), moving in with her father, Norman (Joe Santos), who had created a life for himself as a swinging bachelor.

Cast
Joe Santos as Norman Davis
Melissa Michaelsen as Maxx Davis
Jenny Sullivan as Barbara
Denny Evans as Gary
Jim Weston as Mitch

Casting
Michaelsen and Santos were picked for the roles when a commercial starring Joe aired during one of Melissa's early projects. NBC president Fred Silverman saw the commercial while watching Melissa's TV-movie and reportedly said "I want that guy with that girl." Another source gives credit for the role to the daughter of the producer, James Komack. Maxine (nicknamed "Maxx") Komack, whom the main character was named after, walked in on the screen tests and saw Melissa playing the role. She supposedly blurted out, "That's her. The little blonde girl. That's Maxx!"

Episodes

External links

References

1980 American television series debuts
1980 American television series endings
1980s American sitcoms
English-language television shows
NBC original programming
Television shows set in New York City